Taran is a fictional character from Lloyd Alexander's The Chronicles of Prydain series of novels. Serving as the series's central protagonist, he is first introduced as the assistant pig-keeper at Caer Dallben charged with the care of Hen Wen, the oracular white pig. With dreams of becoming a great hero, over the course of the series, his character matures as he is drawn into the war against Arawn Death-Lord and his champion, the Horned King.

During his journey, he befriends Princess Eilonwy, a young girl his age, Fflewddur Fflam, a wandering bard and minor king, Gurgi, a wild creature between animal and man, and the dwarf Doli. Upon the conclusion of the series, Taran is crowned High King of Prydain and marries Eilonwy.

Appearances in literature

Background and characteristics
Taran is a young man in late adolescence, who lives with the enchanter Dallben and the aged warrior Coll.  He is charged with taking care of the oracular pig Hen Wen and throughout the series is known under the title of Assistant Pig-Keeper.

Taran's age is never given at any time in the series, though at the outset he seems to be approximately fourteen years old.  The readers are also never given any indication as to the character's appearance, and as a result, he has been depicted in many different ways.  In the animated film The Black Cauldron, he is shown as a red-haired, brown-eyed youth who spends a great deal of time staring out of windows and daydreaming; he is voiced by British actor Grant Bardsley.

Taran is headstrong and courageous, though occasionally foolhardy, and harbors an intense desire to prove his worth and heroism through noble acts.  Indeed, much of the series centers on Taran's search for his own worth.

The Chronicles of Prydain
Taran was a foundling discovered by Dallben the Enchanter amongst the slaughter on a battlefield. Dallben brought the baby to be raised and educated at the small hamlet of Caer Dallben, where he would be protected by Dallben, the famed enchanter, and Coll, an aged warrior turned farmer. As Taran grew up he became restless and longed for adventures beyond the borders of Caer Dallben. His time would eventually come when, just after being granted the position of Assistant Pig-Keeper to Hen Wen, Dallben's oracular pig (actually a name Coll conceived for the job that had been Taran's for some time), the animal escapes her enclosure. Taran follows her and soon finds himself caught up in an epic struggle that will determine the fate of the land of Prydain.

During his adventures he is befriended by the great Prince Gwydion.  When the two are captured by the Enchantress Queen Achren, he meets the Princess Eilonwy.  With his help, she frees the ancient, magical sword Dyrnwyn from Achren's clutches, an event that will set in motion the war that could bring about the defeat of Arawn, the Death Lord.  Taran is assisted in his quest by many friends, including the self-styled Bard Fflewddur Fflam, the shaggy creature Gurgi, and the stalwart dwarf warrior Doli.

Taran's adventures see him leading armies against the Death Lord, Arawn, meeting a trio of witches, attempting to rescue the kidnapped Eilonwy and finally struggling to come to terms with his own past. Eventually he proves his worth, both as a soldier and a man, and helps to defeat Arawn in pitched battle. After Arawn is defeated, most of Taran's companions decided to journey to the Summer Country where they will be granted eternal youth and happiness. Taran, however, makes the difficult decision to stay in Prydain and rebuild the land that was nearly destroyed by Arawn. Dalben warns Taran that he is giving up eternal happiness for a difficult life that might end without anyone ever acknowledging his efforts, but Taran remains steadfast in his decision. It is only after this that Dallben and Gwydion reveal to him that he has earned not only his honor, but also the title of High King of Prydain. Taran, it turns out, has fulfilled an old prophecy from The Book of Three which stated that someone of unknown birth would eventually rise up, defeat a serpent (Arawn, Death-Lord of Annuvin implied), choose a kingdom of sorrow over a kingdom of happiness, and thereby prove his worth as the next High King. Taran, the only survivor of a long-past battle, has done just that. With Eilonwy as his Queen, Taran assumes the throne and rules with justice and wisdom until the end of his days.

An aspect of all the trials that Taran must overcome in his life until he becomes High King is that he always has to "let something go". In the first book he must quit his own quest to save Hen Wen so that he can alert the Sons of Don; in the second book he has to let go of a magical brooch that granted him "wisdom" to have the Black Cauldron, and later he has to let go the honor of capturing the Black Cauldron so that he can transport it to be destroyed. In the third book he must give up Eilonwy, although only temporarily while she is fostered in a foreign royal court, and in the fourth book, he gives up his quest to learn of his parentage.  In the last book there is a moment he has to choose between completing his mission and his search for Eilonwy; and there is his momentous decision of giving up eternal life in order to rebuild Prydain.

Like many figures in the series, Taran's name is derived from the Mabinogion, where he is named as the father of a man named Glineu.  Taran is the Welsh word for thunder, and may be related to the Gaulish god Taranis.

Adaptations

Film
Taran appears in the 1985 Disney animated film The Black Cauldron, a loose adaptation of books one and two.

References
Alexander, Lloyd (1964) The Book of Three
Alexander, Lloyd (1965) The Black Cauldron
Alexander, Lloyd (1966) The Castle of Llyr
Alexander, Lloyd (1967) Taran Wanderer
Alexander, Lloyd (1968) The High King

Sources 

 

The Chronicles of Prydain characters
Fictional kings
Fictional Welsh people
Literary characters introduced in 1964
Orphan characters in literature
Teenage characters in literature